Battle Force Zulu is the code-name designation for the following U.S. Navy task forces:

Task Force 60 during 1986's Operation El Dorado Canyon, Operation Prairie Fire, and Attain Document series of freedom of navigation (FON) naval maneuvers in the Gulf of Sidra
Task Force 154, the carrier battle force that operated in the Persian Gulf during 1991's Operation Desert Storm (pictured)

See also
Task Force Zulu

United States Navy task forces